2014 Shanghai Masters may refer to:

2014 Shanghai Masters (snooker)
2014 Shanghai Masters (tennis)